The Prom is a musical with music by Matthew Sklar, lyrics by Chad Beguelin, and a book by Bob Martin and Beguelin, based on an original concept by Jack Viertel. The musical follows four Broadway actors lamenting their days of fame, as they travel to the conservative town of Edgewater, Indiana, to help a lesbian student banned from bringing her girlfriend to high school prom.

The musical had a tryout at the Alliance Theatre in Atlanta, Georgia, in 2016 and premiered on Broadway at the Longacre Theatre in October 2018.

A film adaptation, produced and directed by Ryan Murphy, was released on Netflix on December 11, 2020.

Background 

In 2010, Constance McMillen was a senior at Itawamba Agricultural High School in Fulton, Mississippi. She had plans to bring her girlfriend to their senior prom and wear a tuxedo, and in response, was banned from attending by the school board. McMillen challenged the board's decision; in response, the board decided to entirely cancel that year's senior prom. McMillen and the ACLU sued her school district, and a federal court found the Itawamba School District guilty of violating McMillen's First Amendment rights. However, the judge did not force the school district to reinstate the prom.

The board did eventually allow McMillen to attend prom, but the event, held at a local country club, was attended by only seven students. Local parents quietly organized a separate prom for the rest of the students, making sure to keep the location secret to avoid media attention.

Celebrities—such as Green Day, Cat Cora, and Lance Bass—rallied together via social media to show their support for McMillen and agreed to help sponsor a "Second-Chance" prom, where McMillen and her girlfriend could attend without homophobic backlash.

Productions

Atlanta (2016)
The show played the Alliance Theatre in Atlanta from August 18 to September 25, 2016. Casey Nicholaw was director and choreographer, with set design by Scott Pask, costumes by Ann Roth and Matthew Pachtman, lighting by Kenneth Posner and sound by Peter Hylenski.

Broadway (2018)
The show began previews at the Longacre Theatre on October 23, 2018, with an official opening on November 15, 2018. The production closed on August 11, 2019, having played 23 previews and 309 regular performances. The production cost $13.5 million to stage and did not recoup its investment.

U.S. tour (2021) 
A national tour of The Prom was expected to begin February 2021 in Providence, Rhode Island. It was delayed due to the COVID-19 pandemic. It launched on November 2, 2021, at Playhouse Square in Cleveland, Ohio, The tour played over 20 cities concluding in October 2022.

Switzerland (2021) 
The Le Théâtre Emmen produced a version of the Musical in Swiss German / German language which ran from December 11, 2021 until January 16, 2022. The translation by Nico Rabenald (German), Andréas Härry (Swiss German dialogues), Irène Straub and Silvio Wey (Swiss German lyrics) made some notable changes: Instead of Edgewater, Indiana, the musical is set in the Lucerne hinterland. Also, the four actors aren't from Broadway, but from the German musical hub Hamburg.

México City (2021-2022) 
A latin-american production headed by Marte Calderon and Chema Verdusco as producers was launch on November 6, 2021 played at Centro Cultural Teatro 2; with over 60 regular performances including 2 tour dates on Guadalajara México and Monterrey México

On its first season, who made some changes from the original production: Instead of Edgewater, Indiana, the musical is set in Salamanca Guanajuato. Some of the actors name were change from the adaptation; Instead of Dee Dee Allen is Gigi Flores and instead of Barry Glickman is Benny Torres; Also, the four actors aren't from Broadway Broadway, they are notable actors from musicals on Mexico. The original cast members from this season were: Anahi Allué, Gerardo Gonzalez, Mauricio Salas, Marien Caballero Galve, Oscar Carapia, Beto Torres and Brenda Santabalbina.

For its second season the production has short running performances who were played on Teatro Centenario Coyoacan, with Anahi Allue and Oscar Carapia reprising their roles from the first season, with Mauricio Salas replacing Gerardo Gonzales´s role as Benny, with Roger Gonzalez and Andres Elvira replacing Mauricio Salas´s role as Trent.

This season were played from October 29, 2022 until December 17.

U.S. Regional Premiere (2022) 

The Professional US Regional Premiere played White Plains Performing Arts Center October 7-23, 2022.  The production was Directed by Frank Portanova, Choreographed by Lexie Fenelle Frare & Music Directed by Stephen Ferri.

Plot

Act One 
The musical opens on Broadway, where Eleanor!: The Eleanor Roosevelt Story is celebrating its opening night with its lead cast members Dee Dee Allen and Barry Glickman ("Changing Lives"). The musical is bashed by The New York Times because Dee Dee and Barry do not understand their characters since they are self-absorbed narcissists, resulting in the show closing on opening night. To improve their image, the actors decide to take up "a cause" to appear selfless. They team up with two other actors—Trent Oliver, a Juilliard School graduate down on his luck but who has just been cast in the non-Equity tour of Godspell, and Angie Dickinson, a life-long chorus girl who just quit her job of 20 years in the musical Chicago after the producers never let her go on for the role of Roxie Hart- to find a cause that will make it look like they care. After searching on Twitter, they find Emma, a teenager from Indiana whose prom was cancelled by the Parent-Teacher Association because she wanted to bring her girlfriend. Seeing the opportunity, and some personal connection, the actors decide to go to Indiana to help ("Changing Lives (Reprise)").

Back in Indiana, Emma faces severe bullying, but she reminds herself to breathe and that not everyone is this cruel ("Just Breathe"). Mr. Hawkins, the school principal and Emma's ally, informs her that he has spoken to the state attorney and that he believes they have a chance to reinstate the prom. The school holds a meeting with the PTA to discuss reinstating the prom. As Emma and Mr. Hawkins begin to make progress, Dee Dee, Barry, Angie, and Trent barge in with protest signs to support Emma. Dee Dee reminds everyone what a good person she is for doing this while claiming that this isn't about her, humiliating Emma ("It's Not About Me"). After the meeting, it is revealed that the girl Emma wants to take to prom is Alyssa, a popular but closeted student and the daughter of Mrs. Greene, the head of the PTA. The two argue as Alyssa blames Emma for all the publicity around the prom but Emma reassures her that she didn't want this either and that she just wants to be with her ("Dance with You"). The actors attempt to hold a rally to inspire action for Emma but can only book the halftime show at a monster truck rally. They perform alongside the non-Equity tour cast of Godspell ("The Acceptance Song"). The performance is unsuccessful.

It is later learned that the state attorney ruled that the school must hold a prom. Emma thanks the actors, and Mr. Hawkins and Dee Dee go to Applebee's to celebrate. With the prom back on, students begin to "prompose" to each other. Emma officially asks Alyssa to this new prom and she agrees, promising to come out to be with her ("You Happened"). At Applebee's, Mr. Hawkins, a huge fan of Dee Dee's, tells her how much she inspires him ("We Look to You"). Barry helps Emma get ready for prom and reveals he didn't have the opportunity to go to prom either. Meanwhile, across town, other teens prepare for the prom as well ("Tonight Belongs to You"). As Emma waits outside the gym, she asks Barry to walk her in because she is nervous. As they enter, they realize that the gym is empty. Mr. Hawkins, who is inside desperately trying to resolve the issue, reveals that the PTA put on another prom across town and this one just for Emma, as required by the state attorney. Dee Dee panics that this fake prom will be bad press for her, which angers Mr. Hawkins as he learns about Dee Dee's true intentions. Emma calls Alyssa who tells her she knew nothing about the other prom. Emma asks her to come and be with her but she refuses to come out. Devastated, Emma runs out of the gym, asking all the actors to just go home.

Act Two 
Following the fake prom, the media frenzy around the whole event increases. The actors encourage Emma to step up and become the face of the story, but she is too scared. Angie encourages her by teaching her about zazz, sharing with her a story about Bob Fosse and the original production of Chicago ("Zazz"). Dee Dee returns to talk to Mr. Hawkins, who berates her for being so self-centered. She performs his favorite song to make it up to him and vows to begin thinking of others ("The Lady's Improving"). Trent decides that he may be able to change the minds of the youth of the town due to his small-town upbringing. He confronts a number of the students about how they and their families break the word of the Bible every day and how hypocritical they are being. He encourages them to follow "love thy neighbor" above all ("Love Thy Neighbor").

Alyssa meets with Emma to apologize, telling her about all the pressure her mother puts on her to be perfect and how she blames Alyssa for her father leaving. Emma is unable to accept her apology and they break up ("Alyssa Greene"). The actors book Emma a TV appearance, but she turns it down and tells them that she has her own plan to control the narrative and change minds. Convinced her plan will work and that they will be able to have a prom for everyone, Emma asks Barry to be her date so that he is finally able to fulfill his dream. Barry, overjoyed, agrees as he recounts his  experience missing his own prom ("Barry Is Going to Prom"). Emma uploads a video of her singing with her guitar about her struggles and longing for acceptance, but how despite that she is proud of who she is and won't hide anymore. She inspires other members of the LGBTQ+ community in the area and across the country to comment on their support for her and how it has helped them ("Unruly Heart"). The video goes viral, inspiring the actors to plan an inclusive prom for Emma and all the LGBTQ+ kids across the state. The actors want Emma to finally have a prom but the school doesn't have the money for it.

The actors all donate, including Dee Dee, who turns over her American Express Black card. The PTA is furious over the possibility of a new prom but the students voice their support for an inclusive prom, thanks to Trent's efforts to change their minds. The students suggest Trent stay in Indiana and become their drama teacher. Alyssa comes out to her mother in front of the school, confessing her love for Emma. Mrs. Greene is reluctant to accept Alyssa as she is, but Barry steps in, saying if she doesn't accept Alyssa, she is going to lose her. She is devastated but begins to become more open and agrees to listen to her daughter. The PTA backs down, and quickly makes plans for a new prom, while Dee Dee and Barry question what "success" is. The school puts on this more inclusive prom and LGBTQ+ couples from the area attend, along with the straight couples of James Madison High School. Emma and Alyssa finally get their dance and share a kiss ("It's Time to Dance").

Musical numbers

Act I
"Changing Lives" - Dee Dee, Barry, Ensemble
"Changing Lives" (Reprise) - Dee Dee, Barry, Angie, Trent
"Just Breathe" - Emma
"It's Not About Me" - Dee Dee, Barry, Angie, Trent, Ensemble
"Dance with You" - Emma, Alyssa
"The Acceptance Song" - Trent, Dee Dee, Barry, Angie, Ensemble
"You Happened" - Emma, Alyssa, Kevin, Nick, Ensemble
"We Look to You" - Mr. Hawkins
"Tonight Belongs to You" - Barry, Emma, Mrs. Greene, Ashley, Mandy, Ensemble

Act II
 Entr'acte - Orchestra
"Zazz" - Angie, Emma
"The Lady's Improving" - Dee Dee
"Love Thy Neighbor" - Trent, Ensemble
"Alyssa Greene" - Alyssa
"Barry Is Going to Prom" - Barry
"Unruly Heart" - Emma, Ensemble
"It's Time to Dance" - Emma, Alyssa, Company

Recording 
The original Broadway cast recording of The Prom was digitally released on December 14, 2018. The physical album released on January 11, 2019.

Characters and casts

Critical reception 
The Prom was the first musical of the 2018–2019 Broadway season to be named a New York Times Critics Pick, with Jesse Green calling it "such a joyful hoot. With its kinetic dancing, broad mugging and belty anthems, it makes you believe in musical comedy again."

Frank Rizzo, writing for Variety wrote that "with a tuneful score, a playful book, and performances that remind you what Broadway heart and chutzpah are all about, this cause celebre of a show turns out to be a joyous, funny, and sweet production that should appeal to several generations of musical fans."

New York Magazine's Sara Holdren wrote: "There’s such genuine joy rolling off the stage in The Prom that you’re ready and willing to forgive it its minor misfires... Did I shed several real tears in The Prom’s final scene? Maybe I did… I also seldom stopped laughing. The show is full of witty delights."

Adam Feldman of Time Out Magazine gave the show 4 out of 5 stars, saying "It is cheering to see a musical comedy that engages with modern questions, with a teenage lesbian romance at its center to boot... But while the issues are contemporary, there is a 1980s feel to the character types and the overall style of Chad Beguelin and Matthew Sklar’s score, which resembles their work in The Wedding Singer; a stronger dose of reality in the lyrics and the book (by Beguelin and Bob Martin) would better justify the show’s eventual turn to sentimental education. But Casey Nicholaw’s peppy direction helps give the show enough momentum to power past its narrative potholes and occasional bumps of heavy-handedness."

In The Hollywood Reporter, David Rooney called  the show “one part satire, packed with delicious theatrical in-jokes delivered with aplomb by game stage veterans playing caricatures of themselves; and one part inclusivity teaching moment, reminding us there's a place for everyone beneath the Mylar balloons at a high school dance, even in conservative Indiana. If the two halves aren't entirely seamless, especially in the uneven second act, the show has enough humor and heart to paper over the cracks."

Adaptations

Film 

On April 9, 2019, at a benefit performance of the show hosted by filmmaker and TV stalwart Ryan Murphy, Murphy announced his intentions to adapt the show into a film for Netflix. Murphy said in an interview that he intends for the film to be made quickly, with production on the film set to begin in December 2019. The film is expected to "arrive on the streaming service in fall 2020." On June 25, 2019 (updated on June 26), it was reported that the film is expected to star Meryl Streep, Nicole Kidman, James Corden, Andrew Rannells, Keegan-Michael Key, and Awkwafina. On November 1, 2019, it was announced that Ariana DeBose will play the role of Alyssa. On November 25, 2019, it was announced that newcomer Jo Ellen Pellman will star as the lead character, Emma Nolan. On January 25, 2020, it was announced that Kevin Chamberlin would replace Awkwafina in the role of Sheldon Saperstein, reverting the character's original gender in the musical, since Awkwafina was busy shooting her TV series Awkwafina Is Nora from Queens.

Novelization 
A young adult novel adaptation of the show was released on September 10, 2019, from Penguin Young Readers’ Viking Children’s Books. Saundra Mitchell wrote it, working with the show's creators to transform the musical to print.

Other 
Actresses Caitlin Kinnunen and Isabelle McCalla's kiss during The Prom's performance of "Time to Dance" at the 2018 Macy's Thanksgiving Day Parade received significant media attention for being the first LGBTQ kiss in the parade's broadcast history.

On August 3, 2019, after a performance of the show at the Longacre Theatre, Broadway’s first-known onstage wedding ceremony occurred, between Armelle Kay Harper, a script coordinator on the show, and Jody Kay Smith, a singer and actress who had recently worked with the show's musical director. It was a same-sex wedding.

On June 17, 2019, New York/London Theatrical Licensing Agency Theatrical Rights Worldwide (TRW) acquired and announced the representation of The Prom for the ongoing licensing of the show for professional and amateur productions around the world.  The musical joins TRW's catalogue of Broadway and West End shows including Jersey Boys, Monty Python's Spamalot, The Addams Family, The Color Purple, Million Dollar Quartet, and others.

Awards and nominations

Broadway production

Mexico City Production

See also 
 2010 Itawamba County School District prom controversy

References

External links

2016 musicals
Broadway musicals
Drama Desk Award-winning musicals
LGBT-related musicals
Original musicals
Plays set in Indiana
Proms in fiction
Teen musicals
American plays adapted into films
Musicals inspired by real-life events